Drupal-club (Minsk) is an open-source community in Belarus which promotes free software principles in society. During the 2010-2013 years, this club was an organizer of various social activities such as the Drupal Rally, the Global Learning Drupal Days, and regular sessions. Drupal-club takes part in the implementation of some non-commercial projects and has formed a cooperative via the Drupal Association.

External links 
 Official webpage

References 

Free and open-source software organizations
Content management systems
Free software culture and documents
Social movements in Belarus